Christopher Deninger (born 8 April 1958) is a German mathematician at the University of Münster. Deninger's research focuses on arithmetic geometry, including applications to L-functions.

Career
Deninger obtained his doctorate from the University of Cologne in 1982, under the supervision of Curt Meyer. In 1992 he shared a Gottfried Wilhelm Leibniz Prize with Michael Rapoport, Peter Schneider and Thomas Zink. In 1998 he was a plenary speaker at the International Congress of Mathematicians in 1998 in Berlin. In 2012 he became a fellow of the American Mathematical Society.

Mathematical work

Artin–Verdier duality
In a series of papers between 1984 and 1987, Deninger studied extensions of Artin–Verdier duality. Broadly speaking, Artin–Verdier duality, a consequence of class field theory, is an arithmetic analogue of Poincaré duality, a duality for sheaf cohomology on a compact manifold. In this parallel, the (spectrum of the) ring of integers in a number field corresponds to a 3-manifold. Following work of Mazur, Deninger (1984) extended Artin–Verdier duality to function fields. Deninger then extended these results in various directions, such as non-torsion sheaves (1986), arithmetic surfaces (1987), as well as higher-dimensional local fields (with Wingberg, 1986). The appearance of Bloch's motivic complexes considered in the latter papers influenced work of several authors including , who identified Bloch's complexes to be the dualizing complexes over higher-dimensional schemes.

Special values of L-functions
Another group of Deninger's papers studies L-functions and their special values. A classical example of an L-function is the Riemann zeta function ζ(s), for which formulas such as
ζ(2) = π2 / 6
are known since Euler. In a landmark paper,  had proposed a set of far-reaching conjectures describing the special values of L-functions, i.e., the values of L-functions at integers. In very rough terms, Beilinson's conjectures assert that for a smooth projective algebraic variety X over Q,  motivic cohomology of X should be closely related to Deligne cohomology of X. In addition, the relation between these two cohomology theories should explain, according to Beilinson's conjecture, the pole orders and the values of
L(hn(X), s)

at integers s. Bloch and Beilinson proved essential parts of this conjecture for h1(X) in the case where X is an elliptic curve with complex multiplication and s=2. In 1988, Deninger & Wingberg gave an exposition of that result. In 1989 and 1990, Deninger extended this result to certain elliptic curves considered by Shimura, at all s≥2. Deninger & Nart (1995) expressed the height pairing, a key ingredient of Beilinson's conjecture, as a natural pairing of Ext-groups in a certain category of motives. As of 2018, Beilinson's conjecture is still wide open, and Deninger's contributions remain some of the few cases where Beilinson's conjecture has been successfully attacked (surveys on the topic include Deninger & Scholl (1991)).

L-functions via regularized determinants
The Riemann ζ-function is defined using a product of Euler factors

for each prime number p. In order to obtain a functional equation for ζ(s), one needs to multiply them with an additional term involving the Gamma function:

More general L-functions are also defined by Euler products, involving, at each finite place, the determinant of the Frobenius endomorphism acting on l-adic cohomology of some variety X / Q, while the Euler factor for the infinite place are, according to Serre, products of Gamma functions depending on the Hodge structures attached to X / Q.  expressed these Γ-factors in terms of regularized determinants and moved on, in 1992 and in greater generality in 1994, to unify the Euler factors of L-functions at both finite and infinite places using regularized determinants. For example, for the Euler factors of the Riemann zeta-function this uniform description reads

Here p is either a prime number or infinity, corresponding to the non-Archimedean Euler factors and the Archimedean Euler factor respectively, and Rp is the space of finite real valued Fourier series on R/log(p)Z for a prime number p, and R∞ = R[exp(−2y)]. Finally, Θ is the derivative of the R-action given by shifting such functions.
Deninger (1994) also exhibited a similar unifying approach for ε-factors (which express the ratio between completed L-functions at s and at 1−s).

The arithmetic site
These results led Deninger to propose a program concerning the existence of an "arithmetic site" Y associated to the compactification of Spec Z. Among other properties, this site would be equipped with an action of R, and each prime number p would correspond to a closed orbit of the R-action of length log(p). Moreover, analogies between formulas in analytic number theory and dynamics on foliated spaces led Deninger to conjecture the existence of a foliation on this site. Moreover, this site is supposed to be endowed with an infinite-dimensional cohomology theory such that the L-function of a motive M is given by

Here M is a motive, such as the motives hn(X) occurring in Beilinson's conjecture, and F(M) is conceived to be the sheaf on Y attached to the motive M. The operator Θ is the infinitesimal generator of the flow given by the R-action. The Riemann hypothesis would be, according to this program, a consequence of properties parallel to the positivity of the intersection pairing in Hodge theory. A version of the Lefschetz trace formula on this site, which would be part of this conjectural setup, has been proven by other means by Deninger (1993). In 2010, Deninger proved that  classical conjectures of Beilinson and Bloch concerning the intersection theory of algebraic cycles would be further consequences of his program.

In 2002, Deninger constructed a foliated space which corresponds to an elliptic curve over a finite field, and  showed that the Hasse-Weil zeta-function of a smooth proper variety over Fp can be expressed using regularized determinants involving topological Hochschild homology. In addition, the analogy between knots and primes has been fruitfully studied in arithmetic topology. However, as of 2018, the construction of a foliated space corresponding to Spec Z remains elusive.

Vector bundles on p-adic curves
A series of joint papers with Annette Werner examines vector bundles on p-adic curves. A classical result motivating this study is the Narasimhan–Seshadri theorem, a cornerstone of the Simpson correspondence. It asserts that a vector bundle on a compact Riemann surface X is stable if it arises from a unitary representation of the fundamental group π1(X).

In another paper of 2005, they related the resulting representations of the fundamental group of the curve X with representations of the Tate module of the Jacobian variety of X. In 2007 and 2010 they continued this work by showing that such vector bundles form a Tannakian category which amounts to identifying this class of vector bundles as a category of representations of a certain group.

Foliations and the Heisenberg group
In several joint papers, Deninger and Wilhelm Singhof studied quotients of the n-dimensional Heisenberg group H  by the standard lattice consisting of integer-valued matrices,

 X = H / Γ,

from various points of view. In 1984, they computed the e-invariant of X in terms of ζ(−n), which leads to a construction of elements in the stable homotopy groups of spheres of arbitrarily large order. In 1988, they used methods of analytic number theory to give estimates on the dimension of the cohomology of nilpotent Lie algebras.

Deninger & Singhof (2001) show that foliations on the above space X, which satisfy only slightly weaker conditions, do not admit such Hodge theoretic properties. In another joint paper from 2001, they established a dynamical Lefschetz trace formula: it relates the trace of an operator on harmonic forms the local traces appearing at the closed orbits (on certain foliated spaces with an R-action). This result serves as a corroboration of Deninger's program mentioned above in the sense that it verifies a prediction made by this program on the analytic side, i.e., the one concerning dynamics on foliated spaces.

Entropy and Mahler measures

Another group of Deninger's papers revolves around the space

where Γ is a discrete group, f is an element of its group ring ZΓ, and the hat denotes the Pontryagin dual.

Moreover, it had been known that Mahler measures of certain polynomials were known to be expressible in terms of special values of certain L-functions. In 1997, Deninger observed that the integrand in the definition of the Mahler measure has a natural explanation in terms of Deligne cohomology. Using known cases of the Beilinson conjecture, he deduced that m(f) is the image of the symbol {f, t1, ..., tn} under the Beilinson regulator, where the variety is the complement in the n-dimensional torus of the zero set of f. This led to a conceptual explanation for the afore-mentioned formulas for Mahler measures.  and Deninger later in 2009 carried over these ideas to the p-adic world, by replacing the Beilinson regulator map to Deligne cohomology by a regulator map to syntomic cohomology, and the logarithm appearing in the definition of the entropy by a p-adic logarithm.

In 2006 and 2007, Deninger and Klaus Schmidt pushed the parallel between entropy and Mahler measures beyond abelian groups, namely residually finite, countable discrete amenable groups Γ. They showed that the Γ-action on Xf is expansive if and only if f is invertible in the L1-convolution algebra of Γ. Moreover, the logarithm of the Fuglede-Kadison determinant on the von Neumann algebra NΓ associated to Γ (which replaces the Mahler measure for Zn) agrees with the entropy of the above action.

Witt vectors
Joachim Cuntz and Deninger worked together on Witt vectors. In two papers around 2014, they simplified the theory by giving a presentation of the ring of Witt vectors in terms of a completion of the monoid algebra ZR. This approach avoids the universal polynomials used in the classical definition of the addition of Witt vectors.

Selected bibliography

Artin–Verdier duality

L-functions and Beilinson's conjecture

p-adic vector bundles

The Heisenberg group, Lie algebras, and foliations

Entropy

Witt vectors

References

External links
Website at the University of Münster

1958 births
Living people
20th-century German mathematicians
Academic staff of the University of Münster
Fellows of the American Mathematical Society
21st-century German mathematicians